Bradley Thomas Rowe (born May 15, 1970) is an American actor, writer, producer, and public policy advocate. He appeared in Billy's Hollywood Screen Kiss (1998) and TNT's Purgatory. Other roles include a short stint as recurring character Walt on NewsRadio, Murphy Sinclair on General Hospital, Ty Swindle on Wasteland, and Dan Murphy on Leap of Faith.

Early life 
Rowe was born and raised in Wauwatosa, Wisconsin.

A 1993 University of Wisconsin–Madison economics graduate, Rowe worked as a finance manager for political campaigns in Washington, D.C., before moving to Los Angeles, California, to pursue acting and screenwriting.

Career 
Rowe started his career in the United Talent Agency library and mailroom.

He appeared in the TV movies Vanished, Lucky 7 and Though None Go with Me  and the NBC mini-series The 70s, as well as appearing on Perception as FBI Agent Bobby Dalton, and as Agent Jack Burgess on 1-800-MISSING.

In 1998, he portrayed a recurring character named Walt in the sitcom NewsRadio. The character was the nephew of the eccentric billionaire Jimmy James boss of the WNYX crew.

In 2007, he played Shaun, the romantic interest of the central character (Trevor Wright) of Shelter. That same year, he appeared in the episode "Little Boys" on How I Met Your Mother.

He took part in Tony Zierra's 2011 documentary My Big Break, which follows the early careers of Rowe, Wes Bentley, Chad Lindberg and Greg Fawcett.

Rowe is the host of the talk radio podcast series MIPtalk: Conversations with the World's Most Interesting People, with writer Noam Dromi.

Rowe founded Bright Angel Productions, a video and documentary company.

Filmography

Film

Television

Public policy work 
Rowe advocated for same-sex marriage rights during the California Proposition 8 campaign in 2008.

He spent 10 years teaching and volunteering at Chrysalis in Los Angeles. In the early 2010s, Rowe worked in educational policy for the United Way of Greater Los Angeles, organizing HomeWalk, an event that raised money to fight homelessness.

Rowe graduated with a master's degree in public policy (MPP) from the UCLA Luskin School of Public Affairs in 2013. He was awarded the Ann C. Rosenfield Fellowship in Education Policy by the United Way of Greater Los Angeles.

Until 2017, Rowe was the managing director of BOTEC Analysis, a public policy research and consulting firm based in Los Angeles, and a contributor to the Crime and Justice Program at New York University's Marron Institute of Urban Management.

Personal life 
Rowe and Lisa Fiori were married in 1999. They have a son named Hopper.

References

External links
 
 Brad Rowe - MIPtalk.com Official Podcast Page

1970 births
Living people
Male actors from Milwaukee
University of Wisconsin–Madison College of Letters and Science alumni
American male film actors
UCLA Luskin School of Public Affairs faculty